First Baptist Church is a historic Baptist church at 728 Main Street in Vermilion, Ohio.

It was built in 1888 and added to the National Register of Historic Places in 1979.

References

Baptist churches in Ohio
Churches on the National Register of Historic Places in Ohio
Gothic Revival church buildings in Ohio
Churches completed in 1888
Churches in Erie County, Ohio
National Register of Historic Places in Erie County, Ohio